is the seventh single of the subgroup Minimoni, their second under the alias Minihams, and their last single with Mari Yaguchi. It was released on December 4, 2002, and sold 60,001 copies, reaching number ten on the Oricon Charts.

Track listing 
All songs written and composed by Tsunku.

Members at the time of single 
  (Last single with Mini Moni)

External links 
 Minihams no Kekkon Song entry on the Hello! Project official website

Zetima Records singles
Minimoni songs
2002 singles
Songs written by Tsunku
Song recordings produced by Tsunku
Japanese-language songs
Japanese film songs
Songs written for animated films
Songs about marriage